Shipley is a village and civil parish in the Horsham District of West Sussex, England. The parish includes the village of Coolham and the hamlets of Dragon's Green, Brooks Green and Broomer's Corner.

Shipley is first mentioned in a charter of 1073 as Scapeleia, and in the Domesday Book of 1086 as Sepelei. The name derives from the Old English scēap ('sheep') and lēah ('open ground, such as meadow, pasture, or arable land'). Thus it means 'sheep-clearing' or 'sheep-pasture'.

The western River Adur flows through the village, where it meets a significant tributary, Lancing Brook.

In the 2001 census 1075 people lived in 448 households of whom 596 were economically active. At the 2011 Census the population included the hamlet of Coolham and increased to a total of 1,147.

Shipley was home to Hilaire Belloc who in 1906 purchased Kings Land, with a house,  and Shipley Windmill, which was used in the television series Jonathan Creek as Creek's residence.

The churchyard of St. Mary the Virgin is the burial place of composer John Ireland (1879–1962).

References

External links

Shipley Windmill Website
Shipley Church Website
Shipley Parish Council Website

Horsham District
Villages in West Sussex